Johan Pienaar Airport  is an airport serving Kuruman, a town in Northern Cape province, South Africa.

References

External links
 

Airports in South Africa
Transport in the Northern Cape
Ga-Segonyana Local Municipality